Saidi Hamisi Juma (born 10 March 1996), known as Ndemla, is a Tanzanian footballer who plays as a midfielder for Premier League club Mtibwa Sugar on loan from Simba SC and the Tanzania national team.

References

External links

1996 births
Living people
People from Dar es Salaam
Tanzanian footballers
Association football midfielders
Simba S.C. players
Tanzania international footballers
Tanzanian Premier League players
Tanzania A' international footballers
2020 African Nations Championship players